Mara Petrova (1921–1997) was a Bulgarian pianist, writer and composer born in Sliven, Bulgaria. She studied composition at the State Academy of Music with Vesselin Stoyanov, piano with Pancho Vladigerov, and choral conducting with Marin Goleminov. After completing her studies, she took a position teaching at the Institute for Music and Choreographic Specialists. Petrova also published articles on music and worked as a composer.

Works
Petrova composed for theater, orchestra, chamber ensemble, instruments and choir. Selected works include:
Podranilo (Early Bird) children's operetta
Youth Suite (1953) for orchestra
My Fatherland Overture for orchestra
Dance-Poem (1966) for orchestra
Symphony “April 1876” (1981) for orchestra
Youth Suite for strings and timpani
Triptych for voice, strings and small drum
The Blue-Eyed Girl for voice and string orchestra
Lullaby for voice and string orchestra
Sonata for violin and piano
Sofia Suite for oboe, clarinet, bassoon and small drum
Dance for three bassoons
Sketches for wind trio
Song and Scherzo for flute and piano
Scherzo for clarinet and piano
Sonata and Theme with Variations
Legend about the Apostle
Hristo Botev choral
Winter Tale choral
Poem for my Native Town choral
Bulgaria, lyrics by Hristo Chernaev

References

1921 births
1997 deaths
20th-century classical composers
Bulgarian music educators
Women classical composers
Bulgarian classical composers
Musicians from Sliven
Women music educators
20th-century women composers